Kvea Valley is a rectangular ice-filled valley between Grinda Ridge and Skigarden Ridge, northward of Mount Grytøyr in the Mühlig-Hofmann Mountains of Queen Maud Land, Antarctica. It was mapped from surveys and air photos by the Sixth Norwegian Antarctic Expedition (1956–60) and named Kvea (the sheepcote).

References

Valleys of Queen Maud Land
Princess Martha Coast